Drosophila qiongzhouensis is a species of fly in the subgenus Dudaica.

References 

qiongzhouensis
Insects described in 2018